Park Chung-Hee (born April 10, 1975), also spelled as Park Jeong-hui, is a South Korean handball player who competed at the 2008 Summer Olympics.

In 2008, she won a bronze medal with the South Korean team.

References

External Links

1975 births
Living people
South Korean female handball players
Olympic handball players of South Korea
Handball players at the 2000 Summer Olympics
Handball players at the 2008 Summer Olympics
Olympic bronze medalists for South Korea
Olympic medalists in handball
Medalists at the 2008 Summer Olympics
Asian Games medalists in handball
Handball players at the 2006 Asian Games
Asian Games gold medalists for South Korea
Medalists at the 2006 Asian Games
21st-century South Korean women